Laurence Hynes Halloran (29 December 1765 – 8 March 1831) was a poet, unordained clergyman and felon who became a pioneer schoolteacher, journalist, and bigamist in Australia, founder of the Sydney Public Free Grammar School.

Early life
Halloran was born in County Meath, Ireland and was orphaned while young. He was placed in the care of an uncle, Judge William Gregory, and educated at Christ's Hospital. He entered the navy in 1781 but was gaoled two years later for stabbing and killing a fellow midshipman. He came into notice by the publication of two volumes of verse, Odes, Poems and Translations (1790), and Poems on Various Occasions (1791), and probably about this period became master of Alphington Academy near Exeter; one of his pupils was Robert Gifford, 1st Baron Gifford (born 1779). Claiming falsely to have been ordained by Thomas O'Beirne, Bishop of Ossory, Halloran afterwards became a chaplain in the navy, and in 1805 was on the Britannia at the Battle of Trafalgar. The following year, he was posing as a clergyman in Bath In 1807 he was at the Cape of Good Hope as a chaplain to the forces. In 1811, now also holding a school principal's position, he interfered in a duel between two officers and was removed to Simon's Town. He then resigned his position as chaplain and published a satire Cap-abilities or South African Characteristics. Proceedings were taken against him and he was sentenced to be banished from the colony. It was subsequently necessary for the governor of the colony to declare valid those marriages conducted by Halloran during his time there. Returning to England in 1811, he resumed his pose as a clergyman under half a dozen aliases in a variety of English parishes, also teaching and writing poetry. In November 1818 he was charged with forging a tenpenny frank, was found guilty, and was sentenced to seven years penal transportation to Australia.

Transported to Australia
Halloran arrived in Sydney in June 1819, was immediately given a ticket of leave by Governor Lachlan Macquarie. Halloran, with help from Simeon Lord and John Macarthur, established a school for "Classical, Mathematical and Commercial Education" (also known as Sydney Grammar School). When news of this reached London obstacles were put in his way by the English authorities, but Lachlan Macquarie and Thomas Brisbane successively supported him, and he established a high reputation as a teacher. In February 1827 he applied for a grant of land for a free grammar school which he proposed to establish at Sydney. Governor Darling was, however, less sympathetic, and Halloran had great difficulty in providing for his family of nine children. He founded a weekly paper, the Gleaner, of which the first number appeared on 5 April 1827. However, in September, an action against the paper for libel was successful, and its last number came out on 29 September 1827. In 1828 Darling for the sake of his children gave him the office of coroner but he did not keep the position long, and in the same year was in trouble with Archdeacon Scott, who objected to Halloran's prefacing some public lectures he was giving with part of the Anglican church service. In 1830 he established a "Memorial Office" the intention being that he should draw up statements for people desiring to bring their grievances before the government.

Halloran died at Sydney on 7 March 1831. In addition to the works mentioned Halloran, before leaving England, published four volumes of poems and a play, which are listed in Percival Serle's Bibliography of Australasian Poetry and Verse.

Private life
Halloran was born a Catholic, but became an Anglican in 1792. While living in Exeter he married Mary ("Polly") Boutcher, a Catholic lady ten years older than him, by whom he had six children. His sister's illegitimate daughter Anna (12 years younger than him) also posed as his wife, and they had twelve children together. The year after her death in Australia in 1823, Halloran bigamously married 16-year-old Elizabeth Forrester Turnbull by whom he had four more children.

Legacy
Halloran was a good schoolmaster who honestly endeavoured to re-establish his reputation in Sydney. It was hard on him that his past sins were never allowed to rest. Unfortunately, he was of a quarrelsome nature and owed much of his misfortune to this throughout his life. The statement that he had forged his clerical orders is attested to in a private letter from Henry Hobhouse, under-secretary of state, to Earl Bathurst, and there is ample evidence from his dismissals from clerical office in England that the Anglican authorities there held that he had never been properly ordained. His son, Henry Halloran, born in 1811, became a leading public servant at Sydney and was created C.M.G. in 1878. He was the author of much verse which like his father's was of only mediocre quality. He was well known in the literary circles of his day, and was a good friend to Henry Kendall.

See also
List of convicts transported to Australia
Henry Halloran (son)
Henry Halloran (great grandson)

References
A. G. Austin, 'Halloran, Laurence Hynes (1765–1831)', Australian Dictionary of Biography, Volume 1, MUP, 1966, pp 506–507. Retrieved 20 January 2009

1765 births
1831 deaths
Australian educators
Convicts transported to Australia
Australian people of Irish descent
People from County Meath